John Moore was Archdeacon of Cloyne  from 1665 until 1687.

Moore was born in Queen's County (now called County Laois) and educated at Trinity College, Dublin.  He held livings at Killmocahill; Killeagh; Clonmult; Ballyfeard; Inishannon and Templemichael.  Moore was a Prebendary of Cork Cathedral from 1667 to 1699.

References

Archdeacons of Cloyne
Irish Anglicans
Alumni of Trinity College Dublin
17th-century Irish Anglican priests
People from County Laois